Jill Schary Robinson (born May 30, 1936) is a Los Angeles-based novelist, essayist, and teacher, whose memoirs contend with the themes of addiction, recovery and growing up during the golden age of Hollywood.

Early life
Schary Robinson was born to a Jewish family, the daughter of Dore Schary, the Oscar and Tony Award-winning writer, producer, and head of MGM and Miriam Svet, a painter. In 1956, she married Jon Courrier Zimmer, then a lieutenant in the United States Naval Reserve, in a Jewish ceremony in Beverly Hills.

Having met as children in elementary school, Schary Robinson is a personal friend of actor/philanthropist Jane Fonda.

Writing career
As a copywriter for the advertising agency FCB, Robinson trained with Helen Gurley Brown. Robinson also wrote on women's issues for Cosmopolitan and covered political trials for the SoHo Weekly News. Her first memoir, With a Cast of Thousands is about her experiences growing up among celebrities such as Jane Fonda, Spencer Tracy, Elizabeth Taylor and Adlai Stevenson. She also interviewed political and film personalities on KPFK and KLAC.

Robinson's 1974 memoir about drug addiction, Bed/Time/Story, was turned into a television movie called A Cry For Love. She reviewed books and wrote articles for the New York Times, Los Angeles Times, Vanity Fair, Washington Post, and American and French Vogue.

During the 1980s, Robinson relocated to London and wrote a series of columns on being an American in Britain for London's Daily Telegraph. Her Vanity Fair story on Roman Polanski was included in George Plimpton’s book The Best American Movie Writing for 1998.

In 1999 author Jonathan Lethem described 1999's Past Forgetting as a "quietly moving memoir recounting that great rarity, a truly encompassing and persistent loss of memory." Robinson and her husband Stuart Shaw also performed on cruise ships, reading their play Falling in Love When You Thought You Were Through (adapted from their memoir, published in 2002).

In 2005, Robinson was given a lifetime grant to develop the non-profit Wimpole Street Writers program, which continues both in London and Los Angeles.

In 2009, she was instrumental in saving the Motion Picture and Television Fund's retirement home.

Works
Robinson's major published works are:
 With a Cast of Thousands, 1963
 Thanks for the Rubies, Now Please Pass the Moon, 1972
 Bed/Time/Story, 1974
 Perdido, 1978
 Dr. Rocksinger and the Age of Longing, 1982
 Follow Me Through Paris, 1983
 Star Country, 1998
 Past Forgetting, 1999
 Falling in Love When you Thought You Were Through, 2002

References

External links
 

1936 births
Living people
Writers from Los Angeles
Jewish American novelists
American women novelists
American women essayists
20th-century American novelists
21st-century American novelists
20th-century American women writers
21st-century American women writers
20th-century American essayists
21st-century American essayists
21st-century American Jews